Mandakan (also Romanized as Mandakān, Mandekān, Mandegān, and Mūndakān) is a village in Karimabad Rural District, Sharifabad District, Pakdasht County, Tehran Province, Iran. At the 2006 census, its population was 344, in 84 families.

References 

Populated places in Pakdasht County